, also known as Saitō Toshimasa (斎藤 利政),  was a Japanese samurai during the Sengoku period.
His honorific title from the Imperial Court was Yamashirō-no-kami (山城守). After entering monkhood in his later years, he was also called Saitō Yamashirō-nyudō-no-kami (斎藤山城入道守).

Biography
Originally a monk, he was a seller of oil. He became a daimyō through gekokujō of Toki Yorinari at Mino Province in 1542. Yorinari was forced out of Mino by Saitō Dōsan.

The Saito fortress was located at Inabayama castle. He married 'Omi no kata', a
sister of Akechi Mitsutsuna (Akechi Mitsuhide's father).

He defeated Oda Nobuhide at the Battle of Kanōguchi in 1547.

However, in 1549, eventually Oda Nobuhide was defeated by Dōsan, Nobuhide made peace with Dōsan by arranging a political marriage between his son and heir, Oda Nobunaga, and Dōsan's daughter, Nōhime. Dōsan, therefore, became the father-in-law of Oda Nobunaga. 
Dōsan supported the marriage which allowed Nobuhide to focus on facing Imagawa Yoshimoto.

Several years later, rumors had started to circulate that Dōsan's firstborn son, Saitō Yoshitatsu, was not his natural son and Dōsan started to consider another son, Saitō Kiheiji, or even his son-in-law Oda Nobunaga, as his heirs. This caused Yoshitatsu to rebel and kill his two younger brothers. In 1556, the forces of Dōsan and Yoshitatsu clashed in the Battle of Nagara-gawa which resulted in
the death of Dōsan.

Dōsan's head was taken by a man called Komaki Genta, a retainer of Yoshitatsu's son Saitō Tatsuoki. His remains were originally interred in Sōfuku-ji, but they were later moved to Jōzai-ji because the Nagara River kept overflowing and covering his burial mound. Both temples are located in the city of Gifu which celebrates Dōsan with an annual festival.

Pseudonyms
Saitō Dōsan is known for having a large number of pseudonyms and for frequently changing his name. Some believe that this is because there were two Saitō Dōsan, father and son, and the son adopted his father's name after his death. Other names of Saitō Dōsan are Minemaru (峰丸), Hōrenbō (法蓮坊), Matsunami Shogorō (松浪庄五郎), Nishimura Kankurō Masatoshi (西村勘九郎正利), Shinkurō (新九郎), Nagai Norihide (長井規秀), and Saitō Sakondayu Toshimasa (斎藤左近大夫利政).
The name Saitō was adopted from the former shugodai of Mino who had been overcome by the Nagai clan in the 1520s.

Notable retainers
 Hachiya Yoritaka
 Mori Yoshinari
 Fuwa Mitsuharu
 Inaba Ittetsu
 Ando Morinari
 Ujiie Naotomo
 Hachisuka Masakatsu
 Sakai Masahisa
 Takenaka Shigeharu
 Kanamori Nagachika
 Katō Mitsuyasu
 Sengoku Hidehisa

Family
 Father: Matsuda Motomune (in one traditional story; another version says that he was child of Shinzaemonzo, a monk of Myoukaku-ji Temple)
 Wife: Omi no Kata, daughter of Akechi Mitsutsugu
 Concubine: Miyoshi no Kata
 Children: 
 Saitō Yoshitatsu born to Miyoshi no Kata
 Saitō Magoshirō
 Saitō Kiheiji
 Saitō Toshitaka
 Saitō Nagatatsu (Toshiharu)
 Nōhime (Kicho)

In Popular Culture
 In the Action RPG Nioh 2 he's reimagined as a retired Yokai hunter that fell in love with a female Yokai who bore him two children; Saito Yoshitatsu and the main protagonist "Hide". He's killed by Yoshitatsu's forces at the end of the first act.

See also
 Saitō clan
 Kunitori Monogatari

References

1494 births
1556 deaths
Daimyo
Japanese warriors killed in battle
Dosan